Picture Book is the debut album by British pop and soul group Simply Red, released in October 1985. It contains the US number-one single "Holding Back the Years", and a cover of The Valentine Brothers' "Money's Too Tight (to Mention)". Three other singles were released from the album: "Come to My Aid", "Jericho", and "Open Up the Red Box".

The album helped Simply Red earn a 1987 Grammy nomination for Best New Artist. "Holding Back the Years" was also nominated for Best Pop Performance by a Duo or Group With Vocals.

A special version of the album was released on the then new Compact Disc + Graphics, or CD+G format which when played on a suitable CD player, 4 bit raster graphic images, text and animations would also be displayed on a connected TV screen.

Critical reception

In The Village Voice, Robert Christgau wrote that there were essentially "only two songs on this album", "Money’s Too Tight (to Mention)" and "Heaven", but that Hucknall and the band carry off the album "on mood and groove alone".

Reviewing the 1996 re-release for Q, Nick Duerden described Picture Book as "the most accomplished debut of its year". He said of Hucknall, "With the most prodigious voice this side of Motown and a burning socialist heart, here he infuses everything with a passion that he's rarely matched since."

William Ruhlmann, in a retrospective review in AllMusic, felt that Simply Red produced "a steady R&B groove reminiscent of '60s Stax house band the MG's" and that Hucknall was a "big-voiced soul singer". In the book 1001 Albums You Must Hear Before You Die, Andy Robbins attributed the record's commercial success in both America and the UK to "Holding Back the Years", which he feels is Hucknall's best vocal performance. Robbins noted rock and jazz sounds, along with soul influences.

Commercial performance
The album was commercially successful, appearing in the top 30 album charts of twelve countries, and achieving platinum certification sales in four countries, including the United States and United Kingdom.

Track listing

2008 Collector's Edition bonus tracks

Disc two, DVD: Live at Montreux Jazz Festival (8 July 1986)
 "Grandma's Hands" (Bill Withers)
 "Sad Old Red" (Hucknall)
 "Open Up the Red Box" (Hucknall)
 "The Right Thing" (Hucknall)
 "No Direction" (Hucknall, Fryman)
 "I Won’t Give Up" (Hucknall)
 "Holding Back the Years" (Hucknall, Neil Moss)
 "Picture Book" (Hucknall, Fritz McIntyre)
 "Love Fire" (Bunny Wailer)
 "Jericho" (Hucknall)
 "I Won't Feel Bad" (Hucknall, McIntyre, Tim Kellett, Chris Joyce, Tony Bowers, Sylvan Richardson)
 "Suffer" (Hucknall, Lamont Dozier)
 "Infidelity" (Hucknall, Dozier)
 "Money's Too Tight (to Mention)" (John Valentine, William Valentine)
 "Come to My Aid" (Hucknall, McIntyre)
 "Jericho" [Instrumental] (Hucknall)
 "Heaven" (Byrne, Harrison)
 "Move on Out" (Hucknall)
 "Look at You Now" (Hucknall)

Personnel 
Simply Red
 Mick Hucknall – lead and backing vocals, acoustic piano
 Fritz McIntyre – keyboards, backing vocals
 Tim Kellett – keyboards, trumpet, live backing vocals
 Sylvan Richardson – guitars
 Tony Bowers – bass
 Chris Joyce – drums, percussion

Guest Musicians
 David Fryman – guitars (8), backing vocals (8)
 Ronnie Ross – baritone saxophone (2, 4, 5)
 Ian Dickson – tenor saxophone (2, 4, 5)
 Francis Foster – congas (1, 3)

Production 
 Producer – Stewart Levine
 Engineered and Mixed by Femi Jiya
 Assistant Engineer – Chris Dickie
 Mastered by Arun Chakraverty at Master Room (London, England).
 CD Mastering – Barry Diament
 Sleeve Design – Peter Barrett
 Front Cover Photo – Simon Fowler
 Back Cover Photo – Malcolm Heywood
 Management – Elliot Rashman and Steve Todd, assisted by Andy Dodd and Clive Heylin.

Charts

Weekly charts

Year-end charts

Certifications and sales

}
}

}

}
} 
}

References

External links
Simply Red official website album page

Picture Book (Adobe Flash) at Radio3Net (streamed copy where licensed)

1985 debut albums
Simply Red albums
Albums produced by Stewart Levine
Elektra Records albums